Nationality words link to articles with information on the nation's poetry or literature (for instance, Irish or France).

Events

Works published
 Richard Ames:
 The Female Fire-Ships: A satyr against whoring, published anonymously
 Islington-Wells; or, The Threepenny-academy, published anonymously
 Benjamin Keach, Spiritual Melody
 Nahum Tate, Characters of Vertue and Vice, a verse paraphrase of Joseph Hall's Characters of Vertues and Vices, a 1608 prose work
 Edward Ward, The Poet's Ramble After Riches, published anonymously
 John Wilmot, Earl of Rochester, Poems, &c. on Several Occasions: with Valentinian, a Tragedy, London: Printed for Jacob Tonson, posthumously published

Births
 Seán Clárach Mac Domhnaill (died 1754), Irish poet

Deaths
Birth years link to the corresponding "[year] in poetry" article:
 March 1 – Sultan Bahu (born 1628), Muslim Sufi saint and poet
 October 10 – Isaac de Benserade (born 1613), French poet
 Mathias Balen (born 1611), Dutch historian and poet
 Probable date – Samuel Pordage (born 1633), English poet and cleric

See also

 Poetry
 17th century in poetry
 17th century in literature

Notes

17th-century poetry
Poetry